Linn County is a county located in the northern portion of the U.S. state of Missouri. As of the 2020 census, the population was 11,874. Its county seat is Linneus. The county was organized January 1, 1837 and named after U.S. Senator Lewis F. Linn of Missouri.

Geography

Adjacent counties
Sullivan County (north)
Adair County (northeast)
Macon County (east)
Chariton County (south)
Livingston County (west)
Grundy County (northwest)

Major highways
 U.S. Route 36
 Route 5
 Route 11
 Route 129
 Route 139

Demographics

As of the census of 2000, there were 13,754 people, 5,697 households and 3,760 families residing in the county.  The population density was 22 people per square mile (9/km2).  There were 6,554 housing units at an average density of 11 per square mile (4/km2).  The racial makeup of the county was 97.98% White, 0.60% Black or African American, 0.38% Native American, 0.14% Asian, 0.15% from other races and 0.76% from two or more races. Approximately 0.76% of the population were Hispanic or Latino of any race.

There were 5,697 households, out of which 29.60% had children under the age of 18 living with them, 53.60% were married couples living together, 8.90% had a female householder with no husband present and 34.00% were non-families. 30.30% of all households were made up of individuals, and 16.80% had someone living alone who was 65 years of age or older.  The average household size was 2.37 and the average family size was 2.94.

In the county, the population was spread out, with 25.40% under the age of 18, 7.00% from 18 to 24, 24.40% from 25 to 44, 22.60% from 45 to 64 and 20.60% who were 65 years of age or older.  The median age was 40 years. For every 100 females there were 89.60 males.  For every 100 females age 18 and over, there were 85.70 males.

The median income for a household in the county was $28,242, and the median income for a family was $36,134. Males had a median income of $25,635 versus $18,820 for females. The per capita income for the county was $15,378.  About 11.30% of families and 14.90% of the population were below the poverty line, including 20.20% of those under age 18 and 14.10% of those age 65 or over.

2020 Census

Education

Public schools
Brookfield R-III School District – Brookfield
Brookfield Elementary School (PK-04)
Brookfield Middle School (05-08)
Brookfield High School (09-12)
Bucklin R-II School District – Bucklin
Bucklin Elementary School (PK-06)
Bucklin High School (07-12)
Linn County R-1 School District – Purdin
Linn County Elementary School (PK-05)
Linn County High School (06-12)
Marceline R-V School District – Marceline
Walt Disney Elementary School (K-05)
Marceline Middle School (06-08)
Marceline High School (09-12)
Meadville R-IV School District – Meadville
Meadville Elementary School (K-06)
Meadville High School (07-12)

Private schools
Father McCartan Memorial School – Marceline (K-09) – Roman Catholic
Locust Creek Mennonite School – Laclede (02-09) – Mennonite

Public libraries
Brookfield Public Library
Marceline Carnegie Library

Politics

Local

State

Linn County is split between two districts in Missouri's House of Representatives, both of which are represented by Republicans.

District 6 — Tim Remole (R-Excello). Consists of a thin slice of the eastern part of the county. 

District 7 — Rusty Black (R-Chillicothe). Consists of the central and western parts of the county.

All of Linn County is a part of Missouri's 18th District in the Missouri Senate and is currently represented by Brian Munzingler (R-Williamstown).

Federal

All of Linn County is included in Missouri's 6th Congressional District and is currently represented by Sam Graves (R-Tarkio) in the U.S. House of Representatives.

Political culture

Communities

Cities and towns

Brookfield
Browning (partly in Sullivan County)
Bucklin
Laclede
Linneus (county seat)
Marceline 
Meadville
Purdin

Unincorporated communities

 Bear Branch
 Enterprise
 Eversonville
 Forker
 Fountain Grove
 Garner
 Grantsville
 Haseville
 Hecla
 Leverton
 Lowell
 New Boston
 North Salem
 St. Catharine
 Sedgwick
 Shafter
 Shelby

Notable people
 Doris Akers, gospel singer and composer, was born in Brookfield and resided there until age five.
Gene Bartow, Hall of Fame college basketball coach and NBA executive.
 Jeff Roe, Republican political consultant, was born in Brookfield and lived there until joining the army at age sixteen.
 Walt Disney, animator and founder of the Disney corporation, Disneyland, and Walt Disney World lived on a farm near Marceline as a young boy.
General John J. Pershing, four-star General of the Armies and Commander of the American Expeditionary Forces during World War I, was born in Laclede.

See also
National Register of Historic Places listings in Linn County, Missouri
 USS Linn County (LST-900)

References

Further reading
 A Compendium of History and Biography of Linn County Missouri (1912) online

External links
 Digitized 1930 Plat Book of Linn County  from University of Missouri Division of Special Collections, Archives, and Rare Books

 
1837 establishments in Missouri
Populated places established in 1837